The canton of Les Deux Rives is an administrative division of the Tarn department, southern France. It was created at the French canton reorganisation which came into effect in March 2015. Its seat is in Lagrave.

It consists of the following communes:
 
Aussac
Bernac
Cadalen
Castanet
Cestayrols
Fayssac
Fénols
Florentin
Labastide-de-Lévis
Labessière-Candeil
Lagrave
Lasgraisses
Montans
Parisot
Peyrole
Rivières
Senouillac
Técou

References

Cantons of Tarn (department)